Gregory James Gohr (born October 29, 1967) is an American former Major League Baseball pitcher who played from 1993 to 1996 for the Detroit Tigers and California Angels. He was drafted in the first round of the 1989 Major League Baseball Draft by the Detroit Tigers, and traded in 1996 to the California Angels.

In 1996, he posted the highest rate of home runs per 9 innings of any pitcher with at least 110 innings pitched in Major League Baseball history.

References

External links

1967 births
Living people
California Angels players
Detroit Tigers players
Major League Baseball pitchers
Baseball players from San Jose, California
Santa Clara Broncos baseball players
Fayetteville Generals players
Lakeland Tigers players
London Tigers players
Toledo Mud Hens players
Vancouver Canadians players
American expatriate baseball players in Canada
Anchorage Bucs players
Bellarmine College Preparatory alumni